is a Japanese snack food made by Meiji Seika since 1979. It comes in a package with two compartments. One side has biscuit sticks (which can be sometimes called cracker sticks), the other side has chocolate, strawberry, vanilla, or yogurt flavored frosting used for dipping. The sticks themselves may also be flavored. Some Yan Yan products are sold in rectangular containers with 9 sticks and dip. There is also a new version which includes two flavored dips.

In 1982, British company KP Snacks began licensing Yan Yan for UK markets releasing it under the name Choc Dips.

The sticks 

The sticks were once plain, but recently Meiji has placed pictures of various animals on them with quotes relating to that animal. The quotes are in English, but often appear unorthodox to native English speakers. Examples of these animal quotes include:

 Balloon: Goes Pop
 Bat: Only In The Night / Flying Mammal
 Beetle: Thick Shiny Shell / Lucky Color: Brown
 Butterfly: Flower to Flower
 Cat: Has Nine Lives / Say Meow
 Chick: Eager to Hatch / Lucky Color: Yellow
 Chicken: Kokekokko / Cluck Cluck
 Cow: Moooooo
 Duck: Go For A Swim / Quack, Quack
 Elephant: Jumbo / Longest Nose
 Fox: Beware Of Lies / Cunning And Sly
 Frog: Amphibian / Ribbit
 Giraffe: Tallest Mammal / Longest Neck
 Goat: You Are Lucky Today / Don't Feed Paper
 Grown Baby: Cradle Them All
 Horse: Gallop Away / My "Neigh"bor
 Kettle: Goes Ssss
 Lion: Roar
 Mole: In A Hole / Born to Dig
 Mouse: Eats Cheese / Do Not Be Timid
 Octopus: Eight Arms / Lucky Number: 8
 Owl: Active At Night / Night Predator
 Panda: Go for More / Loves Bamboo
 Rabbit: Eat More Carrots
 Rhinoceros: Think Big / Nose Horn
 Seal: Loves To Sun Tan / Barks Underwater
 Sheep: Wool Sweaters
 Snail: Snail Mail? / Slow Mail
 Squid: Black Ink
 Squirrel: Your Best Friend / Nut Burrower
 Stag Beetle: Love It / Powerful Jaw
 Starfish: Star in the Sea / Star+Fish / Sea Star
 Whale: Biggesy Mammal (Typo: Should be "Biggest Mammal") / Largest Mammal
 Zebra: Herbivore / Fancy Stripes

Some of the animal-related quotes relate not to facts about the animals, but instead to the noise the animal makes, which is printed in a Japanese-influenced English dialect. For example:

 Chicken: Kokekokko
 Cow: Muuuuu

There are also two "golden" non-animal quotes: Golden Egg and Golden Log.

Flavors 
Yan Yan comes in a variety of flavors. This includes vanilla sticks with chocolate, strawberry, mango, vanilla cream, and the newest, hazelnut, or chocolate sticks with vanilla cream.

Relation to other snacks 
Pocky is a similar Japanese snack which includes thinner sticks pre-dipped in cream. The cream comes in a much wider variety of flavors such as green tea cream or honey-flavored cream. Yan Yan is dipped by the consumer themselves, and comes in a more limited assortment of flavors. Meiji also produces another snack called Hello Panda. It is a panda-shaped biscuit with either chocolate, strawberry, vanilla, or matcha (green tea) flavored fillings. Yan Yan is also similar to the American snack Dunk-a-roos.

Nutella has a similar snack called "Nutella & Go" that includes breadsticks or pretzels for dipping into their signature hazelnut spread. It has similar packaging to Yan Yan, but Yan Yan is significantly taller while Nutella & Go is wider.

References

External links
 

Products introduced in 1979
Japanese brand foods
Snack foods